Tigris is an unincorporated community in western Douglas County, in the U.S. state of Missouri. Tigris is located just west of the Beaver Creek bridge on Missouri Route 14.

History

A post office called Tigris was established in 1909, and remained in operation until 1926. The community was named after the Tigris River, in Asia.

References

Unincorporated communities in Douglas County, Missouri
Unincorporated communities in Missouri